Sima Milosavljević-Paštramac, aka Amidža (a nickname meaning "Turkish uncle"; hamlet of Paštrmi, Ramaća, 1776 — Kragujevac, 5 August 1836) was a participant in the First Serbian Uprising and Second Serbian Uprising. As a constant companion of Prince Miloš Obrenović, he was his secretary and manager of the court in Kragujevac. The only preserved konak from the palace complex in Kragujevac is named after his second nickname - Amidžin konak. The house in which he lived is located in Svetozara Markovića Street, which used to be named - Paštrmčeva.

At the time of the First Serbian Uprising, he was a standard-bearer with Duke Antonije Ristić-Pljakić. During Hadži-Prodan's rebellion in 1814, he joined the rebels. He surrendered together with Toma Vučić-Perišić, after negotiations with Miloš Obrenović.

In Takovo, he received a flag from Miloš Obrenović, during the announcement of the Second Serbian Uprising, and thus became Miloš's standard-bearer and his inseparable companion. As a great friend of the prince, he was his advisor in many and most important situations, the manager of the court in Kragujevac, the Boluk-bashi of Miloš's boys, and from February 1835 he was appointed court adviser.

Sima Milosavljević-Paštramac died on 5 August 1836 in Kragujevac.

See also
 List of Serbian Revolutionaries

References 

 Translated and adapted from Serbian Wikipedia:Сима Милосављевић Паштрмац

1776 births
1836 deaths
People from Stragari
Politicians from Kragujevac
Serbian Revolution
Military personnel from Kragujevac